Emanuel Synagogue, founded as The Congregation of the Temple Emanuel in 1938, is a Pluralist synagogue in Woollahra, New South Wales, Australia.  Emanuel Woollahra Preschool (founded as Temple Emanuel Kindy in 1956) is located on the synagogue campus. Emanuel Synagogue is the largest congregation in Australia with  more than 3,500 members offering programs and services across the Progressive, Masorti and Renewal streams of Judaism.

Australia's well-known General, Paul Cullen, was instrumental in the temple's founding, including helping to select its first rabbi.

In May 2018, the synagogue was the first Australian Jewish temple to host a gay wedding.

See also 

Judaism in Australia

References

External links

Synagogues in Sydney
Woollahra, New South Wales
Synagogues completed in 1938
Reform Judaism in Australia
Union for Progressive Judaism